Dragon Magazine may refer to:

Dragon (magazine), an American magazine for Dungeons & Dragons players
Dragon Magazine (Fujimi Shobo), a Japanese light novel magazine